Eric Potter (born 1971) is an American film editor known for his work on the films Underworld: Rise of the Lycans, The Vatican Tapes, The Lincoln Lawyer, The Night Crew, and 9/11.

Selected filmography
 Underworld: Rise of the Lycans (2009)
 Born to Ride (2011)
 Beneath the Darkness (2011)
 The Big Ask (2013)
 Kiss Me (2014)
 Rebound (2014)
 The Night Crew (2015)
 The Vatican Tapes (2015) 
 The Cheerleader Murders (2016)
 Vigilante Diaries (2016)
 Honey 3 (2016)
 The Bronx Bull (2017)
 9/11 (2017)
 Beyond White Space (2018)
 Grand Isle (2019)
 Roped (2020)
 Paydirt (2020)
 Welcome to Sudden Death (2020)
 Paradise Cove (2021)
 Take Back (2021)
 Every Last One of Them (2021)
 Jeepers Creepers: Reborn (TBA)
 97 Minutes (TBA)
 Sweetwater (TBA)

References

External links
 

1971 births
Living people